This page lists notable Old Newingtonians, alumni of the GPS Uniting Church school Newington College in Sydney, Australia. Enrolment years at Newington are bracketed following the surname.

Royal, vice regal & chiefs
 HM King Tāufaʻāhau Tupou IV (1934–1938) – Former King of Tonga
 HRH Prince Viliami Tungī Mailefihi (1896–1897) – Prince Consort of HM Queen Salote Tupou III of Tonga
 HRH Prince Fatafehi Tu'ipelehake (1941–1942) – Son of HM Queen Salote Tupou III of Tonga
 HH Prince Josefa Celua (1872–1873) – son of the King of Fiji and grandfather of;
 Ratu Sir George Cakobau GCMG GCVO OBE KStJ RVC (1927–1932) – Former Governor-General of Fiji
 Ratu Josefa Lalabalavu (1874–1876) – Tui Cakau Paramount Chief of Cakaudrove Province 1879 until 1905

Tongan Nobles
 Hon Fotu ʻa Falefā Veikune (1896–1897) – Governor of Vavaʻu 1936–1939 and Minister of Police 1939–1952
 Hon Solomone Ula Ata OBE (1896–1902) – Tongan nobleman and cousin of Queen Salote.
 The Noble Tuʻihaʻateiho (1919–1922) – Tongan nobleman and cousin of Queen Salote
 The Noble Tuʻiʻāfitu (1953–1955) – Former Governor of Vavaʻu
 Lord Luani (1972–1977) – Former Governor of Vavaʻu
 Lord Vaha'i (1955–1966) – Civil Servant and Parliamentarian and husband of Princess 'Elisiva Fusipala Vaha'i
 Lord Taumoepeau-Tupou of Toula and Kotu (1953–1962) – Diplomat, Cabinet Minister and Life Peer

Baronetage of England
 Sir Gordon Trollope Bt (1898–1901) 15th Baronet Trollope of Casewick
 Hugh Trollope (1964–1966) is the heir presumptive to the baronetcy

Politics and government

Parliamentary service

Australia
 The Hon Ian Armstrong AM OBE (1949–1953) – Former Deputy Premier of New South Wales
 Jeff Bate (1918–1921) – Former NSW and Commonwealth Parliamentarian and husband of Dame Zara Bate
 Henry Bate (1897–1899) – Former NSW Parliamentarian
 The Hon Sir Thomas Bavin KCMG (1889–1890) – Former Premier of New South Wales
 The Hon Eric Bowden (1882–1884) – Former Australian Defence Minister
 Percy Colquhoun (1881–1885) – Former Member NSW Legislative Assembly
 The Hon Colonel Arthur Colvin CBE MC MLC (1897–1898) – Former Member NSW Legislative Council, Soldier, Surgeon and Physician
 The Hon John Cull (1962–1969) – Former member of the New South Wales Legislative Assembly
 The Hon Duncan Gay MLC (1962–1967) – Former Leader of The Nationals & Deputy Opposition Leader in the NSW Legislative Council
 The Hon Carl Glasgow (1896–1899) – Former NSW Parliamentarian
 The Hon Harry Jago (1927–28) – Former NSW Health Minister
 The Hon Andrew Lysaght (1888–90) – Former NSW Attorney-General and Justice Minister
 The Hon Sir Charles Marr KCVO DSO MC (1895) – Former Australian Health Minister
William Rupert McCourt CMG (1899–1901) – Former Clerk of the New South Wales Legislative Assembly
 The Hon Samuel Moore (1865–1869) – Former NSW Secretary for Mines and Minister for Agriculture, and Secretary for Lands
 Neville Perkins OAM (1963–1969) – Former Northern Territory MLA
 The Hon Lt Col Murray Robson CBE DSO (1918–1923) – Former NSW Leader of the Opposition
 The Hon William Robson MLC (1882–1886) – Former member NSW Legislative Council and NSW Legislative Assembly
 The Hon Richard Thompson MLC (1922–1294) – Former member NSW Legislative Council
 The Hon Sir Frederick Tout MLC (1886–1890) – Former member NSW Legislative Council
 Ivor Vidler CBE (1925–1928) – Former Clerk of the NSW Legislative Assembly
 The Hon Winter Warden MLC (1875–1878) – Former member NSW Legislative Council
 The Hon Reginald Weaver (1890–1894) – Former Speaker of the New South Wales Legislative Assembly, Leader of the Opposition and Health Minister
 The Hon Robert Webster (1963–1969) – Former NSW Planning Minister and Sydney Partner Korn/Ferry International
 Trent Zimmerman MP (1974–1986) – Former Federal Member for North Sydney

Papua New Guinea
 Sir Peter Barter GCL OBE (1952–1955) – Former Papua New Guinea Government Minister

Tonga
 HRH Prince Viliami Tungī Mailefihi CBE (1896–1897) – Prime Minister 1923–1941
 Hon. Solomone Ula Ata OBE (1896–1902) – Prime Minister 1941–1949
 Hon. Havea Tui'ha'ateiho OBE – (1919–1922) Deputy Prime Minister 1953–1960
 HRH Crown Prince Tāufaʻāhau Tungi KBE (1934–1938) – Prime Minister 1949–1965
 HRH Prince Fatafehi Tu'ipelehake CBE (1941–1942) – Prime Minister 1965–1991
 Molitoni Finau (1896–1901) – Member of the Legislative Assembly of Tonga from 1919 until 1965
 Lupeti Finau (1933–1936) – Member of the Legislative Assembly of Tonga from 1978 until 1979

Samoa
 Hon. Papalii Laupepa (1951–1958) – Member of the Legislative Assembly of Samoa from 1982 until 1985 and Minister of Justice. He was the son of the paramount chief of Samoa, Malietoa Tanumafili II.

United States
 Mark Keam (1980–1984) –  Member of the Virginia House of Delegates representing the 35th District

Local government
 Lancelot Bavin (1896–1899) – Former Mayor of the Municipality of Willougbhy
 Daniel Bott (1991–1998) – Former Mayor of the Municipality of Strathfield
 George Keith Cowlishaw (1913–1920) – Former Mayor of Mosman Council
 Colonel Arthur Colvin MC (1897–1900) – Former Mayor of the City of Orange
 William Dean (1875–1879) – Mayor of Windsor Shire on twelve occasions from 1893 until 1931
 David Doust (1971–1978) – Former Mayor of the Municipality of Burwood
 William Horner Fletcher (1865-1866) – Former Mayor of Manly Council
 John Fowler (1968–1971) – Former Mayor of the City of South Sydney
 Ross Fowler OAM (1963–1968) – Former Mayor of Penrith City Council
 Percy Hordern (1874-1878) – former Mayor of Petersham
 Edward Howard (1877–1878) – Former Mayor of both the City of Goulburn and the Municipality of Yass
 John Hunt (1872–1874) – Former President of Hornsby Shire
 Harry Jago (1927–1928) – Former Mayor of Ku-ring-gai Council
 Joseph Cuthbert Kershaw (1887–1890) – Former Mayor of Waverley Council
 Royce Jeffrey (1923–1932) – Former Mayor of North Sydney Council
 Brigadier General John Lamrock CB VD (1873–1874) – Former President of Colo Shire Council
 Richard Lennon (1947–1949) – Former Mayor of the Ku-ring-gai Council
 John Lincoln AM (1929–1934) – Former Mayor of North Sydney Council 
 Harold T. Morgan (1882-1883) – Former Mayor of Municipality of Newtown
 Aubrey Murphy MBE (1902–1906) – Former Mayor of the Blue Mountains City Council
 Percy Nolan (1899–1902) – Former Mayor of Manly Council
 Lord Livingstone Ramsay (1882–1885) – Former President of Hornsby Shire
 William Robson (1882–1886) – Former Mayor of the Municipality of Ashfield
 Edwin Sautelle (1888–1892) – Former Mayor of the Municipality of Vaucluse
  John Sautelle (1885-1891) President of Bibbenluke Shire Council
 Robert Staines (1901–1902) – Former Chairman of the Shire of Banana

The civil service
 George Beal ISO (1884–1886) – Former Queensland Auditor-General
 Dr John Burton (1924–1932) – Former Head Department of External Affairs, High Commissioner and Founder Centre for the Analysis of Conflict
 Dr Bruce Maitland Carruthers OBE (1906–1908) – Former Director-General of Health in Tasmania
 John Harper (1867–1869) – Former Chief Commissioner of Railways and Tramways NSW
 Parker Henson (1918–1922) – Former Chairman Sydney County Council
 Walter Loveridge CMG (1880–1884) – Former President of the Sydney Harbour Trust
 Alastair MacGibbon (1980–1985) – Former chief executive Australian Cyber Security Centre
 Walter Cresswell O'Reilly (1894–1896) – Former Commonwealth Film Censor
 Warren Pearson AM (1978–1982) – Former Chief Executive Officer of the National Australia Day Council
 Neville Perkins OAM (1963–1969) – Former Secretary of Aboriginal Affairs NSW
 Harold Quodling (1881–1883) – Former Director Queensland Department of Agriculture
 Thomas J. Roseby (1881–1883) – Former Secretary of Sydney Metropolitan Water, Sewerage and Drainage Board
 James Tandy MBE (1932–1933) – Former Commonwealth Director of Aboriginal Education
 Dr Don Weatherburn PSM (1964–1969) – Professor at the National Drug and Alcohol Research Centre at the University of New South Wales and former Director of the NSW Bureau of Crime Statistics and Research

The diplomatic service
 Dennis Argall (1955–1959) – Australian Ambassador to China 1984–1985
 Dr Brian Babington AM (1968–1973) – Australian Delegate to the United Nations 1988–1992
 Dr John Burton (1924–1932) – Australian High Commissioner to Celyon 1951
 Jonathan Gilbert (1983–1995) – Australian Ambassador to Kuwait since 2017
 Sir Iven Mackay (1897–1900) – Australian High Commissioner to India 1943–1948
 John Tilemann (1959–1963) – Australian Ambassador to Jordan 2001–2005
 David Yardley (1986–1996) – Australian High Commissioner to Kiribati since 2021
 Ric Wells (1968–1973) – Australian Ambassador to France 2011–2014

The armed services
 Rear Admiral Gerry Carwardine AO (1947–1953) – Former Commandant Australian Defence Force Academy
 Flight Lieutenant Keith Chisholm MC DFM (1930–1936) – Pilot recognised for his exploits with the Polish and French resistance, after being shot down over France
 Lieutenant Clive Crowley DCM (1905–1906) – Died during World War I and letters between him and his mother were part of the inspiration for An Australian War Requiem
 Rear Admiral Bill Dovers CSC (1959–1969) – Former naval officer
 Squadron Leader Adrian Goldsmith DFC DFM (1930–1933) – Second World War flying ace
 Brigadier General John Lamrock CB VD (1873–1874) – In command of the 20th Battalion, Australian Imperial Force, in the Gallipoli Campaign
 Commodore Bruce Loxton (1933–1935) – Former Director-General of Naval Manpower in the Royal Australian Navy and naval historian
 Lieutenant Colonel Alex Bath 'Bandy' MacDonald (1913–1916) – Former Commander Darwin Mobile Force and Director Australian Cadet Corps
 Lieutenant Colonel Tom Mills MC & Bar (1919–1925) – The first of only fifteen Australian soldiers to be awarded the MC & Bar during World War II
 Major General Sir Iven Mackay KBE CMG DSO VD (1897–1900) – Commander 2nd Division, 6th Division and South West Pacific Area World War II
 Lieutenant Colonel Roy Morell DSO OBE (1903–1905) – Volunteered for war service during World War I and World War II
 Major General Sandy Pearson AO DSO OBE MC (1932–1936) – Commander Australian Forces Vietnam War and former Commandant Royal Military College, Duntroon
 Captain Oliver Woodward CMG MC (1903–1904) – Soldier noted for his tunnelling activities at the Ypres Salient during the First World War and the subject of the 2010 Australian war film Beneath Hill 60

Academia, education, cultural and scientific institutions

The humanities
 Prof Harold Hunt (1916–1920) – Former Dean of the Faculty of Arts University of Melbourne
 Associate Professor Benjamin Penny (1972–1977) – Research Fellow, School of Culture, History & Language ANU College of Asia and the Pacific and Harold White Fellow at the National Library of Australia

The social sciences
 Dr Bob Howard (1950–1954) – Academic specialising in international relations, former editor of the Current Affairs Bulletin
 Wayne Hudson (1957–1961) – Professor and visiting fellow at ANU Australian Studies Institute

The arts
 Prof Simon Penny (1972–1977) (1968–1973) – Professor of Studio Art, Electrical Engineering and Computer Science at the University of California, Irvine
 Prof Duncan Gifford (1985–1990) – Professor Spanish National Academy of Contemporary Music
 Prof Lyndon Watts (1992–1993) – Professor of bassoon at Berne University of the Arts

Theology
 Prof Hubert Cunliffe-Jones (1917–1921) – Former professor of Theology at the University of Manchester

Legal scholarship and education
 Sir Carleton Allen MC KC (1900–1906) – Former professor of Jurisprudence University of Oxford and Warden of Rhodes House
 Prof Bob Baxt AO (1947–1955) – Former Dean of Law Monash University and former chairman Trade Practices Commission
 Prof Stuart Kaye (1980–1985) – Professor of Law University of Melbourne, former Dean of Law University of Wollongong and former Head of the Law School James Cook University
 Prof Christopher Roper AM (1955–1961) – Former Adjunct Professor City University of Hong Kong, Former Director College of Law Sydney and Former Professor College of Law England and Wales

Mathematics, the natural sciences and engineering
 Prof Chris Rodger (1968–1973) – Scharnagel Professor of Mathematical Sciences Auburn University
 Prof Walter Woolnough (1893–1894) – Former professor of Geology University of Western Australia and Clarke Medalist
 William Dun (1982–1886) – Palaeontologist, Geologist and former president Royal Society of New South Wales
 Emeritus Prof Sever Sternhell AO (1947) – Organic Chemist
 Joseph Fletcher (1865–1867) – Former Director of Linnean Society of New South Wales, Biologist and Editor
 Emeritus Prof James de Haseth (1957–1965) – Emeritus Professor of Chemistry at the University of Georgia
 Prof Roger Hawken (1893–1896) – Former professor of Engineering University of Queensland
 Harold Curlewis (1884–1893) – Former Government Astronomer in Western Australia and 3898 Curlewis is named in his honour

Medical research
 Associate Professor John Carter AO (1957–1961) – Endocrinologist and former president Australian Diabetes Society
 Dr Ian Colditz (1969–1974) – Senior Principal Research Scientist Commonwealth Scientific and Industrial Research Organisation
 Prof Reuben Rose (1958–1966) – Former Dean of Veterinary Science University of Sydney
 Prof Martin Stockler (1971–1978) – Professor of Oncology and Clinical Epidemiology University of Sydney Medical School
 Professor Greg Fulcher OAM (1963–1968)  – Diabetologist and former Director Chronic and Complex Medicine Network, NSLHD
 Professor Peter Green (1959–1964)  – Director, Celiac Disease Center, Columbia University
 Dr Marshall Hatch AM (1947–1950) – Chief Research Scientist CSIRO Division of Plant Industry and Clarke Medalist
 Emeritus Prof John Turtle AO (1947–1953) – Former Kellion Professor of Endocrinology University of Sydney, Co-founder Australian Diabetes Society and Former president International Diabetes Federation
 Prof Donald Wood-Smith (1944–1947) – Professor of Clinical Surgery Columbia University New York
 Prof Graham Colditz (1969–1972) – Niess-Gain Professor at Washington University School of Medicine
 Dr Krishna Hort (1964–1969) – Head, Health Systems Unit Nossal Institute for Global Health, University of Melbourne 
 Dr Colin Laverty OAM (1949–1953) – Gynaecological cytologist and histopathologist
 Prof Bernard Balleine (1974–1979) – Head, Decision Neuroscience Laboratory, School of Psychology University of New South Wales

University administrators
 Prof Nicholas Saunders AO (1959–1962) – Former Vice-Chancellor University of Newcastle and former Dean of Medicine Monash University and Flinders University
 Dr Louis T. Talbot (1902–1904) Former President of Biola University and eponym of the Talbot School of Theology
 Rev James Udy (1933) – Former Master of Wesley College University of Sydney
 Dr Cecil Purser (1879–1881) – Former Deputy Chancellor of University of Sydney
 Sir Percival Halse Rogers KBE (1896–1901) – Former Chancellor of University of Sydney

Schoolmasters
 Dr Peter Crawley (1965–1971) – Pioneer of computer use in school classrooms at Trinity Grammar School, Victoria, Knox Grammar School and St Hilda's School
 Rev Dr Michael Scott Fletcher (1883–1886) – Founding Master of Wesley College, University of Sydney and Professor of Philosophy, University of Queensland
 Sandy Phillips (1894–1898) – Former Headmaster Sydney Grammar School
 Major General Sir Iven Mackay KBE CMG DSO VD (1897–1900) – Former Headmaster Cranbrook School and former chairman AAGPS NSW
 Ray Hille OAM (1955–1961) – Former Principal The Peninsula School

Cultural and scientific organisations
 Dr George Abbott (1881–1884) – Former President Royal Australian Historical Society
 Torrington Blatchford (1886–1890) – Former Government Geologist Western Australia and executive board member of Council for Scientific and Industrial Research
 Noel Burnet (1916–1920) – Founder of Koala Park Sanctuary
 Douglas Burrows MBE CBE (1932–1934) – Co-founder of the Children's Medical Research Foundation
 Dr Warwick Cathro (1957–1964) – Former Assistant Director-General National Library of Australia who was pivotal in the development of Trove
 Sir Richard Boyer KBE (1901–1909) – Former chairman Australian Broadcasting Commission
 Dr Colin Branch (1951–1952) – Former Chairman of the Minerals and Energy Research Institute of Western Australia
 Sir Ian Clunies Ross (1912–1916) – Former chairman CSIRO
 Sir Talbot Duckmanton CBE (1934–1938) – Former general manager Australian Broadcasting Commission
 Tim Hart (1977–1979) – Director of Information, Multimedia and Technology Melbourne Museum and Director Royal Exhibition Building
 Dr Andrew Houison (1863–1865) – Founding President Royal Australian Historical Society
 Frank Howarth PSM (1963–1969) – Chair of NSW Heritage Council and Former Director Australian Museum and Royal Botanic Gardens, Sydney
 Howard McKern (1931–1935) – Former Deputy Director Museum of Applied Arts and Sciences
 Walter Cresswell O'Reilly – Founding President National Trust of Australia (NSW)
 Jim Service AO (1945–1949) – Former chairman National Museum of Australia and National Gallery of Australia Foundation
 Ian Stephenson (1965–1972) – Curator University of New England and former Director Canberra Museum and Gallery and Historic Places ACT

Royal Society of New South Wales
 Prof Bernard Balleine (1974–1979) – Fellow
 Dr Donald Hector AM (1957–1967) – President of the Society 2012–2015
 Dr Gordon Packham (1943–1947) – Clarke Medal for Geology in 2001
 Dr Keith Crook (1944–1949) – Clarke Medal for Geology in 1983
 Dr Marshall Hatch AM (1947–1950) – Clarke Medal for Botany in 1973
 Howard McKern (1931–1935) – President in 1963
 Ass Prof Ronald Aston (1912–1918) –  President in 1948
 Prof Henry Priestley (1898–1901) – President in 1942
 Prof Walter George Woolnough (1893–1894) – Clarke Medal for Geology in 1933 and President in 1926
 Joseph James Fletcher (1865–1867) – Clarke Medal for Biology in 1921
 William Sutherland Dun (1882–1886) – President in 1918

The professions

Religion
 Major Cyril Bavin OBE (1893–1895) – Former Methodist missionary in Fiji and General Secretary to the YMCA Migration Department
 Rev Anthony Brammall (1973–1978) – Vice-Principal Sydney Missionary and Bible College
 Rev Alex Campbell OBE (1891–1901) – Former chairman Congregational Union of Australia and New Zealand and president Sydney City Mission
 Rev Prof Hubert Cunliffe-Jones (1917–1921) – Former Chairman of the Congregational Union of England and Wales
 Rev Lionel B. Fletcher D.D. (1877–1954) – Evangelist and Congregational minister
 Rev Simon Hansford (1971–1980) – Moderator Synod of New South Wales and the ACT of the Uniting Church in Australia
 Gary Hill (1973–1978) – Executive Director The Crusader Union of Australia
 Rev Dr David Manton OAM (1949–1953) – Former Moderator New South Wales Synod, Uniting Church in Australia
 Rt Rev David Mulready (1960–1964) – Former Anglican Bishop of North-West Australia
 Rt Rev John Stewart (1953–1954) – Former Bishop of the Eastern Region and Vicar General of the Anglican Diocese of Melbourne
 Rev Gloster Udy OAM MBE (1933) – Uniting Church in Australia Minister

Law
 The Hon Sir Thomas Bavin KCMG (1889–1890) – Former judge of the Supreme Court of New South Wales
 The Hon Justice Sir Percival Halse Rogers KBE (1896–1901) –  Former judge of the Supreme Court of New South Wales
 The Hon Justice Leycester Meares AC CMG KC (1924–1926) –  Former judge of the Supreme Court of New South Wales, chairman of the New South Wales Law Reform Commission
 The Hon Justice Kenneth Asprey CMG KC (1914–1922) – Former NSW Supreme Court Judge and Voyager Royal Commissioner
 The Hon Justice Edwin Lusher KC (1925–1931) –  Former judge of the Supreme Court of New South Wales
The Hon Master William Parker (1883–1887) – Former NSW Master in Equity and Lunacy
 His Honour Judge David Edwards (1889–91) – Former judge of the District Court of New South Wales, NSW Electoral Commissioner and Royal Commissioner
 His Honour Judge Herbert Curlewis (1881–1887) – Former judge of the District Court of New South Wales; husband of Ethel Turner
 The Hon Justice Cecil Cook (1912–1920) – Former judge of the Industrial Commission of New South Wales
 The Hon Garry Downes AM KC (1956–1960) – Former Federal Court Judge, President Administrative Appeals Tribunal and former president Union Internationale des Avocats
 The Hon Roger Gyles AO KC (1950–1954) – Former Federal Court Judge, Royal Commissioner Building Industry in New South Wales and former president NSW Bar Association and Australian Bar Association
 The Hon Angus Talbot (1949–1953) – Former Land and Environment Court of New South Wales Judge
 His Honour Dr John Lincoln AM (1929–1934) – judge of the District Court of New South Wales
 The Hon Justice George Wright (1934–1935) – Former Supreme Court of Western Australia Judge
 The Hon Justice Richard White (1967–1972) – NSW Supreme Court Judge
 The Hon Horton Williams KC (1947–1950) – Former Supreme Court of South Australia Judge
 Ian Barker KC (1948–1952) – Former Solicitor-General of the Northern Territory, and former president New South Wales Bar Association
 Percy Dawson (1881–1883) – Founding partner of one of the firms that became Ashurst Australia
 Stuart Fuller (1979–1984) – Former global managing partner King & Wood Mallesons
 Alan Loxton AM (1931–1933) – Former senior partner Allen, Allen and Hemsley and President of the Law Society of New South Wales
 Arthur E. Abbott (1888–1894) – former senior Partner Garland, Seaborn, Abbott and President of the Law Society of New South Wales
 John J. Watling (1912–1918) – Former partner Sly & Russell and President of the Law Society of New South Wales
 John Nelson (1951–1953) – Former partner Gadens and President of the Law Society of New South Wales
 A.B. Shand KC (1880–1881) – Sydney Silk and Royal Commissioner
 David Wilson KC (1891–1896) – Sydney Silk, former owner of Tocal, New South Wales and furniture maker
 Reginald Kerr Manning (1878–1882) – Established and edited with George Rich The Bankruptcy and Company Law Cases of New South Wales.
 Milton Love (1852–1924) – stipendary magistrate
 Stuart Fuller (1979–1984) – Global Head of Legal Services KPMG

Medicine
 Dr George Henry Abbott (1881–1884) – Surgeon and former Fellow University of Sydney Senate
 Dr Stanley Devenish Meares CBE (1921–1924) – Former President Australian Council Royal College of Obstetricians and Gynaecologists
 Harry Critchley Hinder (1881–1883) – Surgeon and Former President of the NSW Branch of the British Medical Association
 Sir Keith Jones (1924–1927) – Surgeon and Former President of the Australian Medical Association
 Sir Herbert Maitland (1883–1887) –  Surgeon
 Sir William Morrow DSO ED (1919–1921) – Former President Royal Australasian College of Physicians
 John Moulton OAM (1949) – Former Wallabies team doctor and surgeon
 Dr Herbert Russell Nolan (1880–1885) – Performed the first appendicectomy in Australia
 Bob Norton OBE (1933–1940) – Former President Royal Australasian College of Dental Surgeons
 Dr Hugh Pearson MBE (1931–1936) – Surgical urologist instrumental in the foundation of the Australian Kidney Foundation
 Professor Bill Pomroy (1965–1971) – Professor of Veterinary Parasitology Massey University
 Dr Cecil Purser (1879–1881) – Former chairman Royal Prince Alfred Hospital
 Brian Sommerlad (1954–1958) – Honorary consultant plastic surgeon, past president British Association of Plastic Surgeons and the Craniofacial Society of Great Britain and Ireland 
 Dr Frank Tidswell (1881–1884) – Former Director New South Wales Government Bureau of Microbiology and Director of Pathology at the Royal Alexandra Hospital for Children
 Dr C. Savill Willis (1894) – Principal medical officer of the Education Department of NSW

Business

Advertising
 Chris Mort (1970–1975) – Former chairman and CEO McCann Erickson Australia

Art and antiques
 Peter Cook (1940–1942) – Former proprietor Grafton Galleries, Double Bay, and presenter on ABC Television's For Love or Money.
 Barry Stern (1948–1949) – Former proprietor Barry Stern Galleries Paddington.

Banking and financial services
 Sir Frederick Tout (1886–1890) – Former Chairman of Bank of NSW

Business disability advocacy
 Dr Mark Bagshaw (1971–1974) – Disability reform advocate

Business investment
 Bee Taechaubol (1987–1992) – Private equity investor

Broadcasting and entertainment
 Bruce Bond (1944–1946) – Finance and business broadcaster
 Peter Bush (1964–1970) – Former chairman of Nine Entertainment
 Reg Lane (1912–1914) – Founded Macquarie Radio Network and former general Manager of 2GB
 David Leckie (1962–1968) – Former CEO Nine Network and former managing director Seven Network
 Garth Barraclough OBE (1924–1928) – Former chairman EMI

Building
 Richard Crookes (1956–1961) – Founded Richard Crookes Constructions one of Australia's largest private construction companies in 1976
 Ben Cottle (1974–1981) – Founder and managing director of FDC Construction
 John Cooper (1961–1967) – Board member and general manager of Concrete Constructions
 Alex Rigby A.M., E.D. (1929–1933) – Past President of the Australian Institute of Building 1970–1972 and Director of Kell & Rigby 1952–1984

Computing
 Ian Diery (1958–1967) – Former Vice-president Apple Inc.

Farming and grazing
 Deuchar Gordon (1882) – Manar, Braidwood, New South Wales.
 Hugh Munro  (1874–1878) – Keera, Bingara, New South Wales.
 Hunter White (1883–1885) – Havilah, Mudgee, New South Wales.

Food and beverage production
 Geoffrey H. Arnott (1918–1920) – Former chairman Arnott's Biscuits
 Halse Rogers Arnott (1891–1895) – Medical practitioner and former chairman Arnott's Biscuits Holdings
 Garth Barraclough OBE (1924–1928) – Former chairman Arnott's Biscuits Holdings
 Peter Bush (1964–1970) – Former CEO McDonald's Australia
 Owen Howell-Price (1938–1944) – Director and former chairman Dairy Farm South Asia and CEO Woolworths
 David Johnson (1947–1950) – Former CEO Campbell Soup Company
 Bert Locke OBE (1920–1925) – Former chairman Tooheys

Horticulture
 Myles Baldwin (1991–1996) – Garden Designer and horticulturist
 Alf Ellison (1918–1920) – Camellia breeder after whom the camellia japonica A.O. Ellison is named
 Ben Swane AM (1941–1944) – Former proprietor of Swane's Nurseries, Dural, and gardening presenter on 702 ABC Sydney

Insurance
 Sir Cecil Hoskins (1903–1906) – Former Chairman of AMP
 John Lawes (1916–1926) – Former chairman of QBE Insurance
 Jim Millner AM (1933–1937) – Former president NRMA

Mining
 Oliver Woodward CMG MC (1903–1904) – Former general manager and Director of North Broken Hill Mines

Property and real estate development
 William Boyce Allen (1865–1867) – One of the first sworn valuers under the Real Property Act in New South Wales
 Bert Locke OBE (1920–1925) – Former chairman Lend Lease Corporation
 Jim Service AO (1945–1949) – Chairman JG Service, Chairman ACTEW and Deputy chairman Australand Property Group

Racehorse owners and breeders
 Alf Ellison (1918–1920) – Star Kingdom, Baramul Stud
 Hunter White (1883–1885) – Rogilla, Havilah Stud

Restaurateurs, chefs and sommeliers
 Andrew Cibej (1982–1987) – Chef and restaurateur, Vini, Berta and 121BC Cantina & Enoteca
 Con Dedes – Restaurateur Sydney Rowing Club, Abbotsford, and Kirribilli Club, Dedes on the Wharf, Deckhouse, Dedes at the Point, Flying Fish, Pyrmont, Flying Fish & Chips at The Star, Sydney
 Ned Goodwin (1981–1987) – Master of Wine, sommelier, wine-writer and TV presenter
 Neil Perry AM (1968–1973) – Chef and restaurateur Rockpool, food-writer and TV presenter LifeStyle Food

Importing, wholesaling and retailing
 Preston Lanchester Gowing (1891–1899) – Former chairman Gowings
 Percy Hardy (1882–1888) – Former managing director Hardy Brothers
 Walter Hardy (1877–1880) – Former managing director Hardy Brothers
 Edward Lloyd Jones (1885–1887) – Former chairman David Jones
 Jim Millner AM (1933–1937) – Former chairman Washington H Soul Pattinson
 Robert Millner (1959–1968) – Chairman Washington H Soul Pattinson
 Arthur Shorter (1898–1900) – Former managing director Shorters
 Arthur H. Way (1879–1881) – Former chairman of E. Way & Co. department store in Pitt Street in Sydney
 Mervyn Winn (1920–1924) – Former chairman of Winns department stores in Sydney and Newcastle

Telecommunications
 Robert Millner (1959–1968) – Chairman TPG Telecom

Wool
 Keith Chisholm MC DFM (1930–1936) – Woolbuyer
 George Le Couteur OBE (1931–1934) – Woolbroker
 Tom Mills MC (1919–1925) – Woolbuyer
 Sir Gordon Trollope Bt (1898–1901) – Woolbroker

Philanthropy
 Douglas Burrows MBE CBE (1932–1934) – Sydney Medical School Foundation's Douglas Burrows Chair of Paediatrics and Child Health established in 1983 in his honour having been Chairman of the Royal Alexandra Hospital for Children and a significant financial supporter
 Elliston Campbell (1902–1908) – Through a bequest funded the Adyar Library and Research Centre in Madras, India, and the Campbell Theosophical Research Library for the Theosophical Society, Sydney
 Carlyle Greenwell (1897–1901) – $1 million Carlyle Greenwell Research Fund in Anthropology and Archaeology University of Sydney
 Edwin Cuthbert Hall (1886–1891) – Edwin Cuthbert Hall Chair of Middle Eastern Archaeology University of Sydney
 Mervyn Horton AM (1930–1935) – $8 million of contemporary art Art Gallery of New South Wales Mervyn Horton Bequest
 George Johnson (1913–1915) – $15 million George and Nerissa Johnson Bequest for the arts
 Dr Colin Laverty OAM (1949–1953) – Benefactor of funds and art works to National Gallery of Australia, National Gallery of Victoria, Biennale of Sydney and Gold Coast City Art Gallery
 Colonel Thomas Millner MC VD (1897–1901) – Benefactor of TG Millner Field, home ground of Eastwood Rugby Club
 Dr Mitchell Notaras (1948–1952) – $1.1 million Mitchel J Notaras Scholarship for Colorectal Medicine University of Sydney
 The Hon Justice Leycester Meares AC CMG KC (1924–1926) – Benefactor of Kidsafe
 Clive Ramaciotti (1894–1900) – $75 million Clive and Vera Ramaciotti Foundation for biomedical research
 Robert Storr (1935–1936) – $5 million Robert W Storr Chair for hepatic medicine University of Sydney
 Hunter White (1883–1885) – Supported post-war repatriation with substantial gifts of land and the Church of England.

Club presidents
 Charles Challice (1927–1932) – Chairman of the Cabbage Tree Club 1961–1962
 The Hon Justice Cecil Cook (1912–1920) – President of the University Club 1957–1960
 Clive Curlewis (1884–1890) – Former President of Palm Beach Surf Life Saving Club
 Alf Meares (1919–1920) – President of the Schools Club 1933–1935
 Fred Meares (1898–1900) – President of Sydney Rowing Club1954–1964
 Richard Eve (1895–1898) – President of the Schools Club 1943–1945
 William Deuchar Gordon (1882–1884) – President of the Australian Club 1936–1939
 The Hon Justice Sir Percival Halse Rogers KBE (1896–1901) – President of the University Club 1935–1945
 Eric Sydney Kelynack (1893–1898) – Founding President of the Schools Club 1926–1928
 Alan Loxton AM (1931–1933) President of the Australian Club 1987 – 1990
 Sir William Morrow DSO ED (1919–1921) – President of the Australian Club 1972–1975
 Tim Peken OAM (1953–1957) – President of the University & Schools Club 1993–1996
 Bill Picken (1958–1967) – Chairman of the Sydney Turf Club 2008–2010
 Doug Stewart (1910–1919) – President of the Schools Club 1937–1939
 Stephen Ward (1951–1956) – President of the Ski Club of Australia 1980–1982

Sport

Athletics
 Nigel Barker (1895–1901) – Olympic Games Bronze Medallist Athletics
 Morgan McDonald (2008–2013) – 2017 World Championships in Athletics distance runner
 Josh Ralph (2004–2009) – 2014 Commonwealth Games
 Stephen Wilson OAM (1984–1987) – Paralympic Games Gold Medallist Athletics

Australian Rules
 Dane Rampe (2003–2008) – Sydney Swans player in the Australian Football League
 Jack Hiscox (2007–2012) – Sydney Swans player in the Australian Football League

Badminton
 Raymond Tam (1995–2004) – Badminton 2014 Commonwealth Games

Basketball
 Nick Kay (2009–2010) – 2018 Commonwealth Games Basketball gold medalist
 Ray Rosbrook (1915–1939) – Former coach of the New South Wales Basketball Team

Boxing
 Nikita Tszyu (2011-2015) – Light middleweight professional boxer
 Tim Tszyu (2007–2012) – Light middleweight professional boxer and Australian National Boxing Federation's super middleweight champion.

Cricket
 George Bayly (1874–1875) – New Zealander cricketer
 Tim Caldwell OBE BEM (1927–1930) – Former chairman Australian Cricket Board and NSW Sheffield Shield Cricketer
 James Cleeve (1881–1884) – Former NSW Sheffield Shield Cricketer
 Edwin Evans (1865–1866) – Former Test Cricketer
 Sam Everett (1917–1918) – Former NSW Sheffield Shield Cricketer
 Tom Garrett (1867–1872) – Former Test Cricketer
 Arthur Hoskings (1885–1886) Western Australian and North American representative cricketer
 Andrew Jones (1978–1990) – Former CEO of Cricket NSW
 Alan McGilvray AM MBE (1923–1924) – ABC Cricket Commentator
 Lawrence Neil-Smith (2012–2017) – Tasmanian cricketer
 Johnny Taylor (1906–1915) – Former Dual International Test Cricketer and Wallaby

Equestrian
 Phillip Dutton OAM (1976–1979) – 1996 & 2000 Summer Olympics equestrian dual Gold Medallist for Australia and 2016 Summer Olympics equestrian Bronze Medallist for USA.
 Shane Rose (1978–1983) – 2008 Summer Olympics equestrian Silver Medallist and 2016 Summer Olympics equestrian Bronze Medallist

Fishing
 Harry Andreas (1891–1895) – Big-game fisherman who pioneered the sport in New Zealand
 Sir Herbert Maitland (1883–1887) – Regarded as the father of big-game fishing in Australia

Golf
 Prosper Ellis (1908–1912) – Golf course architect and amateur scratch golfer

Ice Hockey
 Arthur Cuthbertson (1900–1906) – Represented NSW in the first two Goodall Cup finals

Judo
 Warren Richards (1960–1966) – 1976 Summer Olympics judo

Rowing
 Roy Barker (1894–1900) – 1912 Summer Olympics rowing
 Vern Bowrey (1960–1965) – 1972 Summer Olympics rowing
 Stuart Carter (1971–1976) – 1976 Summer Olympics rowing
 James Chapman (1992–1997) – 2012 Summer Olympics rowing silver medalist
 Tom Chessell (1929–1931) – 1952 Summer Olympics rowing Bronze Medallist
 Howard Croker OAM (1954–1956) – Founder of Croker Oars
 Sam Hardy (2003–2013) 2019 World Rowing Championships Bronze medalist
 Steve Handley (1969–1974) – 1980 Summer Olympics rowing
 Rob Jahrling (1991–1992) – 2000 Summer Olympics rowing Silver Medallist
 Judge Fred Kirkham (1945–1953) – 1956 Summer Olympics rowing Bronze Medallist
 Matthew Long (1988–1993) – 2000 Summer Olympics rowing Bronze Medallist
 Kim Mackney (1961–1966) – 1972 Summer Olympics rowing
 Michael Morgan OAM (1957–1964) – 1968 Summer Olympics rowing Silver Medallist
 Geoff Stewart (1984–1991) – 2000 & 2004 Summer Olympics dual rowing Bronze Medallist
 James Stewart (1984–1991) – 2000 & 2004 Summer Olympics dual rowing Bronze Medallist
 Stephen Stewart (1985–1995) – 2004 Summer Olympics rowing Bronze Medallist
 Richard Wearne (1981–1989) – World Rowing Championships Silver & Bronze Medallist

Rugby Union
 Allan Alaalatoa (2010–2011) – Current Brumbies team member
 Eric Bardsley (1918–1923) – Former Wallaby
 Scott Bowen (1985–1990) – Former Wallaby and Head Coach Eastern Suburbs Rugby Club
 James Brown (1947–1951) – Former Wallaby
 Harry Bryant (1917–1923) Former Wallaby
 Adam Byrnes (1987–1999) – Forner Russian Bears, former Melbourne Rebels, Queensland Reds member
 Alan Cameron (1945–1948) – Former Wallaby Captain
 John Carroll (1946–1949) – Former Wallaby
 James Cleeve (1881–1882) – Inter-colonial rugby union player
 John Cleeve (1881–1882)) – Inter-colonial cricket player
 Percy Colquhoun (1881–1885) – Inter-colonial rugby union player
 Dave Cowper (1923–1927) – Former Wallaby Captain, Coach and Chairman of Selectors
 Sydney Fallick (1882–1885) – Inter-colonial rugby union player
 Nick Farr-Jones AM (1974–1979) – Former Rugby World Cup winning Wallaby Captain
 Vunipola Fifita (2012–2014) – Current Brumbies team member
 Aub Hodgson (1924–29) – Former Wallaby
 Peter Jorgensen (1980–1986) – Former Wallaby
 Bruce Judd (1920–1924) – Former Wallaby
 Phil Kearns AM (1979–1984) – Former Rugby World Cup winning Wallaby and Captain
 Bayley Kuenzle (2010–2016) – Current Western Force team member
 John Lamb (1924–1925) – Former Wallaby
 Reg Lane (1912–1914) – Claimed 1 international rugby cap for Australia as a Waratah
 Nathan Lawson (2010–2016) – Member of the men's rugby seven's squad at the Tokyo 2020 Olympics.
 Dr Eden Love (1921–1927) – Former Wallaby
 Larry Newman (1909–1921) – Former Wallaby
 Graeme Macdougall (1953–1958) – Former Wallaby
 Stuart Macdougall (1955–1965) – Former Wallaby
 George Mackay (1919–1922) – Claimed 1 international rugby cap for Australia as a Waratah
 Bill McLaughlin (1929–1930) – Former President Australian Rugby Union and Wallaby
 Tepai Moeroa (2011–2013) –  Parramatta Eels 2014–2019, Waratahs 2020–present.
 James Egan Moulton Jnr (1882–1888) – Played for NSW against the 1888 British Lions Team and against Queensland in inter–colonial games
 Earle Page (1922–1927) –  Selected for Combined Australian Universities and as a reserve for NSW
 Bryan Palmer (1915–1916) – Former Wallaby Coach and Waratahs team member
 Tom Perrin (1924–1927) – Former Wallaby
 Christian Poidevin (2005–2016) – Current LA Giltinis team member
 Roy Prosser (1949–1959) – Former Wallaby
 David Pusey (1987–1996) – Former Brumbies, Western Force and Munster Rugby team member
 Hugh Roach (1998–2010) Current Waratahs team member
 Alan Thorpe (1914–1915) – Former Wallaby
 William Tasker (1906–1911) – Former Wallaby
 Hugh Taylor (1906–1913) – Former Wallaby
 James Turner (2011–2016) — Current Waratahs team member
 Lachlan Turner (2000–2005) – Former Wallaby
 John Williams (1953–1958) – Former Wallaby

Rugby League
 Brian James (1955–1960) – Former Kangaroo
 Oriel Kennerson (1937–1940) – Former member of Newtown Jets
 Joel Luani (2008–2010) – Current member of Wests Tigers
 Joey Lussick (2011–2013) – Current member of Manly Warringah Sea Eagles
 Taane Milne (2011–2013) – Current member of St. George Illawarra Dragons
 Tepai Moeroa (2011–2013) –  Parramatta Eels 2014–2019, Waratahs 2020–present.
 Cameron Murray (2010–2015) – Current member of South Sydney Rabbitohs
 Bailey Simonsson – (2014–2016) – Current member of Canberra Raiders
 Toluta'u Koula – (2015–2020) – Current member of Manly Warringah Sea Eagles

Football
 Chris Triantis (1999–2004) – Current player Sydney Olympic FC
 Jonathan Aspropotamitis (2009–2014) – Current player Western Sydney Wanderers FC

Sailing
 Tony Fisher (1942) – 1973 Sydney to Hobart Yacht Race line honours winning skipper 
 David Forbes OAM (1943–49) – 1972 Summer Olympics sailing gold medalist
 Edward Psaltis (1973–1978) – 1998 Sydney to Hobart Yacht Race handicap winning skipper
 David Witt (1984–1989) – Ocean racer and Scallywag skipper

Tennis
 Ashley Campbell (1893–1898) – Dual Australian Open men's doubles champion
 Percy Colquhoun (1881–1885) – Inter-colonial tennis player
 Albert Curtis (1889–1892) – 1896 Queensland Doubles Champion 1897 NSW Singles Championship 1905 runner-up in the singles final of the inaugural Australasian Championships
 Stanley Doust (1887–1895)  – Former Australia Davis Cup team Captain and Wimbledon doubles finalist
 Ernest Hicks (1891–1894) – Player/manager 1913 Australia Davis Cup team
 Thomas Hicks (1885–86) – Player and administrator who managed Australasia's participation in early Davis Cup competitions.

Triathlon
 Greg Bennett (1984–1989) – World series Champion 2002 and 2003, Australian National Champion 1998, 1999, 2000. Summer Olympics 2004 and 2008 triathlete

Water polo
 James Clark (2003–2008) – 2012 Summer Olympics water polo
 Anthony Hrysanthos (ON 2013) – 2020 Summer Olympics water polo

The arts, architecture and the media

Actors, presenters and directors
 Stuart Bocking (1981–1986) – 2UE night shift Presenter
 William Carter (1913–1918) – Silent film actor who starred in Those Who Love (1926)
 Arthur Dignam (1955–1956) – Actor The Devil's Playground and the original Australian production of Jesus Christ Superstar
 Eden Gaha (1981–1986) – Television personality, producer and President of Shine America
 Matt Holmes (1981–1993) – Actor Blue Heelers and Sea Patrol
 John Kachoyan (1995–2000) – Creative Director MKA: Theatre of New Writing and Director in Residence Bell Shakespeare
 Alexander Lewis – Musical theatre actor with New York's Metropolitan Opera and The Juilliard School
 Ben Lewis – Actor portraying the Phantom in the Australian production of Andrew Lloyd Webber's Love Never Dies
 Charles Mesure (1982–1987) – Actor Hercules: The Legendary Journeys, Xena: Warrior Princess and  Outrageous Fortune
 Maurice Parker (1969–1979) – Presenter Simon Townsend's Wonder World and television producer
 Jack Scott (ON 2012) – Actor in the 2021 Network Seven series RFDS
 Jeremy Lindsay Taylor (1983–1991) – Actor Heartbreak High, Something in the Air and Sea Patrol
 Andrew Tighe (1964–1973) – Theatre Director and Actor for the Sydney Theatre Company
 Sandy Winton (1983–1988) – Actor playing Michael Williams in Neighbours
 Darren Yap (1980–1985) – Theatre Director, Actor and Associate Director Sydney 2000 Olympic Ceremonies

Visual artists
 Simon Fieldhouse (1963) – Artist
 Rogey Foley (aka Ellis D Fogg) (1957–1959) – Lumino kinetic sculptor
 Frank Hinder AM (1916–1918) – Blake Prize winning Artist
 Hal Holman OL OAM (1932) – Former Senior Artist for Papua New Guinea and designer of the National Crest
 Mervyn Horton AM (1930–1935) – Founding Editor Art in Australia
 Greg Louden (2000–2006) – Academy Award winning visual effects artist
 Dave Morley (1982–1991) – AACTA Award winning visual effects artist
 Simon Penny (1968–1973) – Interactive media artist
 Andrew Stark (1976–1981) – Street photographer and author
 Leslie Board (1893–1896) – Artist represented in the AGNSW and chief scenic designer of J.C. Williamson's
 Quinton Tidswell (1923–1924) — Artist known for his architectural works on paper

Literature
 Prof Leslie Allen (1894–1899) – Former professor of English Royal Military College, Duntroon, Chairman Literature Censorship Board and poet
 Leslie Alfred Redgrave (1899–1902) – Novelist and non-fiction writer
 John Gunn (1937) – Winner of the Children's Book of the Year Award: Older Readers
 Will Kostakis (1995–2006) – Sydney Morning Herald Young Writer of the Year

Journalism and other writing
 Malcolm Brown (1963–1964) – Crime Writer and former Sydney Morning Herald  journalist
 Peter Charley (1973–1974) – Walkley Award winning Executive Producer Al Jazeera North American investigative unit
 Patrick Cook (1962–1967) – Satirist, cartoonist and AFI Award winning screenwriter
 Graham Davis (1966–1971) – Walkley and Logie Award winning investigative journalist
 Barry Divola (1972–1977) – Rock and Roll Journalist and Sydney Morning Herald Columnist
 Charles Brunsdon Fletcher – Former Editor Sydney Morning Herald
 Benjamin Genocchio (1981–1986) – Former Art critic for the New York Times
 Greg Haddrick (1973–1978) – Logie and AWGIE Award winning screenwriter, TV producer and creator of Underbelly
 Peter Holder (1974–1982) – Journalist and managing director of Daily Mail Australia
 Christian Jantzen (1986–1995) – Macquarie Sports Radio 954 presenter
 Greg Jennett (1985–1986) – ABC Television political correspondent and presenter of Capital Hill ABC News 24
 Tony Jones (1970–1974) – Walkley Award winning host of Lateline and Q & A on ABC TV
 Christopher Lee (1962–1964) – AFI Award and AWGIE Award winning screenwriter of Secret Life of Us
 David McGonigal (1966–1967) – Polar regions writer and photographer
 Warwick Moss (1958–1965) – Actor, television personality and New South Wales Premier's Literary Award winning writer
 Nick Olle (1990–1995) – Journalist, producer Dateline on SBS TV
 Frank Walker Snr (1934–1936) – Journalist and author
 Frank Walker Jnr (1967–1972) – Author and journalist
 Joel Werner (1983–1995) – ABC Radio National science journalist and radio producer/presenter
 Mark Whittaker (1978–1983) – Author and Walkley Award winning journalist for The Australian
 Max Solling OAM (1955–1959) – Urban and sports historian

Musicians and composers
 Keith Asboe (1945) – Organist and composer
 Matt Bruce (2002–2007) – Violinist and concertmaster of the Australian Brandenburg Orchestra
 Thomas Champion (2002–2007) – Member of The Preatures
 Tobias Cole (1976–1988) – Countertenor
 Duncan Gifford (1985–1990) – International award-winning concert pianist
 David Hansen – Countertenor
 Graham Lowndes (1958–1961) – Singer and songwriter Mouthmusic and Survival's a Song.
 Brett McKern (1981–1990) – Organist and composer
 Jack Moffitt (2002–2007) – Member of The Preatures
 James Olds (1998–2003) – Bass-Baritone
 David Rumsey (1947–1955) – Organist and composer
 Alan Sandow (1964–1968) – Sherbet Drummer
 Stephen Rae (1972–1979) – AFI Award winning Film and TV Musician and Composer
 Gary Shearston (1950–1955) – Australia's best selling Folk Singer
 Lyndon Watts (1992–1993) – Principal bassoonist Munich Philharmonic

Architects and engineers
 Arthur Anderson (1881–1883) – Founder and first president of the Federal Council of the Royal Australian Institute of Architects
 Andrew Benn (1988–1993) – 2014 Architecture Award NSW Australian Institute of Architects
 Henry Budden CBE (1886–1888) – RAIA Sir John Sulman Medal winning architect
 Hedley Norman Carr (1921–1922) RIBA bronze medal-winning architect
 Douglas Gardiner (1918–1922) – Partner in Bates Smart & McCutcheon
 Carlyle Greenwell (1897–1901) – Partner in Kent Budden & Greenwell
 William Hardwick (1873–1877) – Former Principal Architect (Western Australia)
 Eric Heath – Architect of the former Plaza Theatre (Sydney)
 Edward Hewlett Hogben (1889–1891) – Architect of Leuralla and the 1911 frontage of the Carrington Hotel, Katoomba
 Archer Hoskings (1881–1883) – Sydney, London, Perth and Johannesburg based architect
 Harry Jefferis (1883–1885) Western Australian architect
 Peter Kaad (1911–1914) – Designer of the now demolished Rural Bank Building in Martin Place, Sydney
 William Monks (1883–1885) – Southern NSW architect
 Alex Popov (1958–1960) – RAIA Wilkinson Award and Robin Boyd Award winning Architect
 Edwin Sautelle (1886–1892) – Engineer who designed the suspension bridge at Parsley Bay and the stone gates at South Head General Cemetery
 Colin Still (1950–1960) – RAIA Sir John Sulman Medal winning Architect
 Lord Livingstone Ramsay (1882–1885) – Active in the northern suburbs of Sydney and in the RAS and President of Hornsby Shire
 Stanley Rickard (1899–1900) – Sydney and Los Angeles-based architect
 Thomas Tidswell (1881-1886) - Designer of the Lyne Park Harbour Baths, Rose Bay, New South Wales
 Colonel Alfred Warden (1884–1887) – Soldier, military engineer and architect
 William Hardy Wilson (1893–1897) – Architect, artist and author

Buildings designed by Old Newingtonian architects

See also 

 Newington College
 List of Old Newingtonians awarded Imperial and Australian honours
 List of Old Newingtonians with Australian Dictionary of Biography biographies

References

External links
 Newington College website
 ONU Website

Lists of people educated in New South Wales by school affiliation
 
Sydney-related lists